The Premio Carlo e Francesco Aloisi is a Group 3 flat horse race in Italy open to thoroughbreds aged two years or older. It is run at Capannelle over a distance of 1,200 metres (about 6 furlongs), and it is scheduled to take place each year in November.

History
The event was formerly known as the Premio Umbria. It was named after Umbria, a region of central Italy.

For a period the Premio Umbria held Group 3 status. It was promoted to Group 2 level in 1982, and relegated back to Group 3 in 1988.

The race was given its present title in 2007. It is now run in memory of Carlo Aloisi (died 1990s) and his brother Francesco (died 2007). Carlo was a former president of UNIRE, a governing body of horse racing in Italy, and Francesco was president of the Jockey Club Italiano.

Records
Most successful horse since 1971 (3 wins):
 Rosendhal – 2010, 2012 (dead-heat), 2013

Leading jockey since 1986 (3 wins):

 Salvatore Sulas – Thinking Robins (2009, dead-heat), Rosendhal (2012, dead-heat, 2013)

Leading trainer since 1986 (3 wins):
 Armando Renzoni – Dancing Eagle (1987), Arranvanna (1991), Rosendhal (2010)

Winners since 1986

Earlier winners
 1971: Azzeccagarbuglio
 1972: Arnaldo da Brescia
 1973: Azzeccagarbuglio
 1974: Pipino
 1975: Pipino
 1976: My Royal Prima
 1977: Dublin Taxi
 1978: Tanfirion
 1979: Super Sky
 1980: Godot
 1981: Super Sky
 1982: Bold Apparel
 1983: Kirchner
 1984: Proskona
 1985: Nacacyte

See also
 List of Italian flat horse races

References

 Racing Post:
2018, 

 capannelleippodromo.it – Albo d'Oro – Premio Umbria.
 galopp-sieger.de – Premio Carlo e Francesco Aloisi (ex Premio Umbria).
 horseracingintfed.com – International Federation of Horseracing Authorities – Race Detail (2016).
 pedigreequery.com – Premio Carlo e Francesco Aloisi – Roma Capannelle.

Horse races in Italy
Open sprint category horse races
Sports competitions in Rome